The family Natalidae, or funnel-eared bats, are found from Mexico to Brazil and the Caribbean islands. The family has three genera, Chilonatalus,  Natalus and Nyctiellus. They are slender bats with unusually long tails and, as their name suggests, funnel-shaped ears. They are small, at only  in length, with brown, grey, or reddish fur. Like many other bats, they are insectivorous, and roost in caves.

Classification 
Family Natalidae contains the following 10 species in 3 genera:

Genus Chilonatalus
Cuban funnel-eared bat, Chilonatalus micropus
Bahaman funnel-eared bat, Chilonatalus tumidifrons
Genus Natalus
Brazilian funnel-eared bat, Natalus macrourus
Jamaican greater funnel-eared bat, Natalus jamaicensis
Hispaniolan greater funnel-eared bat, Natalus major
Mexican greater funnel-eared bat, Natalus mexicanus
Cuban greater funnel-eared bat, Natalus primus
Mexican funnel-eared bat, Natalus stramineus
Trinidadian funnel-eared bat, Natalus tumidirostris
Genus Nyctiellus
Gervais's funnel-eared bat, Nyctiellus lepidus

References

 
Bat families
Taxa named by John Edward Gray